Oskar Brüsewitz (May 30, 1929 – 22 August 1976) was an East German Lutheran pastor who committed public self-immolation on August 18, 1976,  to protest the repression of religion in the Communist state of East Germany.  He died four days later.

Biography
With the Second World War nearing its end, Brüsewitz joined the Wehrmacht in 1944 as a fifteen-year-old, was captured by the Red Army and became a prisoner of war. He worked as a shoemaker after the war and converted to Christianity in 1954, then attended a Lutheran seminary from 1964 until 1969 in Erfurt. In 1970 he was ordained in the Evangelical Lutheran Church at Rippicha, near the town of Zeitz. He was critical of the East German Communist regime imposed by the Soviet Union after the war and symbolic acts of protest, including the installation of a cross of neon lamps at his church, brought him to the attention of the authorities. The leadership of his church sided with the state, rather than its priest, and asked, in 1976, for Brüsewitz to be moved to another rectorate. This was the immediate trigger for his suicidal protest in a crowded public square in front of the Michaelis church in Zeitz.  In front of hundreds of persons, Reverend Brüsewitz "poured gasoline over himself and lighted up in flames". Neues Deutschland, the daily newspaper of the Communist SED party, reported the event afterward and described Brüsewitz as "an abnormal and sick man who suffered from delusions."
The fire was quickly doused by officials from the Ministry for State security, but Brüsewitz died four days later from his burns.

On the day of his protest he carried pamphlets accusing the communists of repression which read; "Funkspruch an alle: Die Kirche in der DDR klagt den Kommunismus an! Wegen Unterdrückung in Schulen an Kindern und Jugendlichen" ("A Radio message to everyone: The church in the GDR accuses communism! Because of the suppression of children at school"). In his suicide note he wrote of a "feigned deep peace, which had also intruded Christianity" in East Germany while in truth there was "a mighty war between light and darkness" ("zwischen Licht und Finsternis ein mächtiger Krieg").

Brüsewitz died of his severe burns on August 22, 1976 in a hospital in Halle Dölau. His self-sacrifice brought support from both his parishioners and figures in the church and led to a reappraisal within the church hierarchy of its relationship with the Communist dictatorship. The Protestant Church now sees Brüsewitz's protest as an early step towards the mass popular protests which led to the collapse of East Germany in 1989.

The Communist authorities initially attempted to suppress news of the event then, when news leaked and public support for his action grew, they branded him a psychopath. On August 31 Neues Deutschland, the official newspaper of the ruling Socialist Unity Party (SED), printed an article entitled "Du sollst nicht falsch Zeugnis reden" "You shall not bear false witness" which asserted that self-immolation was the action of a sick, crazy man. A similar article appeared in Neue Zeit, the newspaper of the East German Christian Democratic Union.

The Protestant church of the ecclesiastical province of Saxony commemorated his sacrifice twenty years later in 1996, six years after the reunification of Germany. Bishop Dehmke called his death an "act of desperation" in protest against the repressive nature of the communist regime and the collaboration of church members who had grown too close to the state.

To mark the 30th anniversary of his death, Neues Deutschland wrote an apology for the article they had carried at the time, admitting that the piece had been "slanderous" and written, not by journalists, but in one of the many offices of the central committee of the SED. In addition they published some of the thousands of critical letters to the editor they had received but not printed in 1976.
In the Federal Republic of Germany, the Paneuropa-Union established a Brüsewitz-Center to document the repression of opposition within the former East Germany.

Brüsewitz's death is known in Germany as the Fanal von Zeitz or "Fire Signal of Zeitz".

References

Literature 
 K. Motschmann: Oskar Brüsewitz, Würzburg 1978, 
 H. Müller-Embergs, H. Schmoll, W. Stock: Das Fanal. Das Opfer des Pfarrers Brüsewitz aus Rippicha und die evangelische Kirche, Berlin 1993.
 Harald Schultze (Hrsg.): Das Signal von Zeitz. Reaktionen auf die Selbstverbrennung von Oskar Brüsewitz, Leipzig 1993, 
 H. Müller-Embergs, W. Stock, M. Wiesner: Das Fanal. Das Opfer des Pfarrers Brüsewitz aus Rippicha und die evangelische Kirche, Münster 1999 (erweiterte 2. Auflage), 
 Freya Klier: Oskar Brüsewitz. Leben und Tod eines mutigen DDR-Pfarrers, Berlin 2004, 
 Krampitz, Karsten; Tautz, Lothar; Ziebath, Dieter: " Ich werde dann gehen..." - Erinnerungen an Oskar Brüsewitz, Leipzig 2006,

Film 
 Der Störenfried. Ermittlungen zu Oskar Brüsewitz. Dokumentarfilm von Thomas Frickel (1992)

External links 
 
 Biography on the MDR website
 Leben und Wirken von Oskar BrüsewitzBiographie by Stiftung zur Aufarbeitung der SED-Diktatur (PDF)
 „Der Protestant“, Article in Berliner Tagesspiegel of 6 August 2006
 „Du sollst nicht falsch Zeugnis reden“, Article in Berliner Zeitung of 19./20. August 2006
 UOKG-conference on 30th anniversary of Oskar Brüsewitz's death
 Bundesregierung
 Stiftung zur Aufarbeitung der SED-Diktatur
 Das Fanal
 Aug. 18, 2006 article in Die Welt: Der Fall Oskar Brüsewitz

1929 births
1976 suicides
People from Šilutė District Municipality
20th-century German Lutheran clergy
People from Bezirk Erfurt
German Army personnel of World War II
Burgenlandkreis
Self-immolations in protest of the Eastern Bloc
Suicides in East Germany
German prisoners of war in World War II held by the Soviet Union
People from East Prussia